The Puducherry Legislative Assembly is the unicameral legislature of the Indian union territory (UT) of Puducherry, which comprises four districts: Puducherry, Karaikal, Mahé and Yanam. Out of eight union territories of India, only three have legislatures and they are Delhi, Puducherry and Jammu and Kashmir. After delimitation shortly after its formation, the Puducherry legislative assembly has 33 seats, of which 5 are reserved for candidates from scheduled castes and 3 members are nominated by the Government of India. 30 out of 33 Members are elected directly by the people on the basis of universal adult franchise and the remaining three are nominated by the central government. These nominated members enjoy same powers as elected members of the assembly.

Geographically, the area under the Puducherry UT consists of three disjointed regions, with Puducherry and Karaikal districts surrounded by districts of Tamil Nadu, Yanam district an enclave of East Godavari district of Andhra Pradesh, and Mahé district bordered by districts of Kerala. The four districts were ruled by French before they were integrated into India in 1962. For ease of administration, during French rule, the area under these four districts was divided into 39 assembly constituencies. After becoming a UT of India, Puducherry was divided into 30 assembly constituencies, which were restructured in 2005 by the Delimitation Commission of India.

History

Assembly during French rule 

In 1946, French India (Inde française) became Overseas territory (Territoire d'outre-mer) of France.
Then a Representative Assembly (Assemblée représentative) was created. Thus, in 1946, on 25 October, the representative assembly of 44 members has replaced the general council (conseil général). The Representative Assembly had 44 seats until merger of Chandernagore in 1951. Later, it reduced to 39 seats.

Merger and formation of Union Territory 
The French government transferred the four enclaves to the Indian Union under a de facto treaty on 1 November 1954. Later the territory was merged with India on 16 August 1962.

On 10 May 1963, the Indian Parliament enacted the Government of Union Territories Act, 1963 that came into force on 1 July 1963. This introduced the same pattern of government that prevailed in the rest of the country, but subject to certain limitations. Under Article 239 of the Indian Constitution, the President of India appoints an Administrator LG with such designation as he may specify to head the administration of the territory. The President also appoints the Chief Minister. The President, on the advice of the Chief Minister, appoints the other Ministers. The Union Territories Act, 1963 limits the number of elected members of the assembly to 30 and allows the central government to appoint not more than 3 nominated MLAs. The same act ensures that seats are reserved for Scheduled Castes in the legislative assembly.

The Representative Assembly was converted into the Legislative Assembly of Pondicherry on 1 July 1963 as per Section 54(3) of The Union Territories Act, 1963 and its members were deemed to have been elected to the Assembly. Thus, the First Legislative Assembly was formed without an election. Elections for the assembly have been held since 1964.

Nominated MLAs

Very few state/U.T. legislative assemblies have nominated MLAs and their voting powers are limited with Puducherry being the only exception. In 2021, the Supreme Court of India has clarified two important aspects related to the nominated MLAs.. The first one is about their nomination. The court held that as per the 1963 act the central government is empowered to nominate the MLAs even without consulting the Government of Puducherry. The second one is about the power of vote of the nominated MLAs. The court also held that the nominated MLAs enjoys voting powers at par with elected MLAs as the 1963 law per se did not differentiate between the nominated MLAs from the elected ones.

Tenures of different legislative assemblies of Puducherry
Source:

Membership by party 
Members of Puducherry assembly by their political party (As on 24.06.2022) :

Members of Legislative Assembly

See also 
 List of constituencies of Puducherry Legislative Assembly
 List of Chief Ministers of Puducherry
 List of leaders of the opposition in the Puducherry Legislative Assembly
 List of lieutenant governors of Puducherry
 List of speakers of the Puducherry Legislative Assembly
 Puducherry (Lok Sabha constituency)
 List of Rajya Sabha members from Puducherry
 Puducherry Municipal Council
 Yanam Municipal Council

Notes

References

External links 
 Pouducherry Legislative Assembly
 Member of Legislative Assembly of Puducherry 2006-11

 
State legislatures of India